Richard Snell may refer to:
 Richard Snell (businessman), former Federal-Mogul CEO
 Richard Snell (cricketer) (born 1968), South African cricketer
 Richard Snell (criminal) (1930–1995), convicted murderer executed in 1995
 Richard Snell (make-up artist) (1955–2006), American makeup artist